A multichannel analyzer (MCA) is an instrument used in laboratory and field applications to analyze an input signal consisting of voltage pulses. MCAs are used extensively in digitizing various spectroscopy measurements, especially those related to nuclear physics, including various types of spectroscopy (alpha-, beta-, and gamma spectroscopy).

Operation

A multichannel analyzer uses a fast ADC to record incoming pulses and stores information about pulses in one of two ways:

Pulse-height analysis
In pulse-height analysis (PHA) mode, incoming pulses are characterized based on their amplitude (peak voltage). The output spectrum is a histogram of these pulses, where the height of each channel corresponds to the number pulses counted within a narrow range of amplitudes. The resolution of the output spectrum depends on the number of channels of the MCA, which is on the order of a few thousand for typical instruments.

In alpha-, beta-, and gamma spectroscopy, PHA is used to measure the energy distribution of particles emitted in nuclear decay. Incoming particles are absorbed by a detector medium and excite voltage pulses whose amplitudes are proportional to their energy. After many pulses have been counted, the output spectrum shows the energy distribution of the radiation incident on the detector.

Multichannel scaling mode
In multichannel scaling (MCS) mode, the MCA records a pulse count-rate over time. Unlike PHA, MCS does not differentiate pulses of different amplitudes. Instead, the MCA records all measured counts in one channel for a set time interval (called the "dwell time"), then switches to the next channel to record the subsequent time interval, and so on.

The internal control voltage signal used to switch channels when the dwell time elapses is often available to the experimenter and can be used to trigger changes in the experimental setup. In this arrangement, the MCA acts as an X–Y recorder, observing changes in the count rate as a function of the controlled experimental parameter. For example, a Geiger counter connected to an MCA in MCS mode could be used to record the amount of ionizing radiation emitted by a neutron generator at different voltages.

Output Interface 
Once a histogram has been recorded, the data is sent to a computer, displayed on a screen on the MCA, or (in older models) sent directly to a printer.

Modern MCAs typically interface with a computer via USB or Ethernet, but some older or specialty models use RS-232 or PCI.

See also
Geiger counter
Oscilloscope

References

Radioactivity
Laboratory equipment